Michael Morrissey (died 10 May 1947) was an Irish Fianna Fáil politician. He was first elected to Dáil Éireann as a Fianna Fáil Teachta Dála (TD) for the Waterford constituency at the 1937 general election. He was re-elected at every subsequent general election that he contested. He died in 1947 during the 12th Dáil, a by-election was held on 29 October 1947 which was won by John Ormonde of Fianna Fáil.

References

Year of birth missing
1947 deaths
Fianna Fáil TDs
Members of the 9th Dáil
Members of the 10th Dáil
Members of the 11th Dáil
Members of the 12th Dáil
Politicians from County Waterford